Michael John Duncliffe (born 17 September 1947) is an English former professional footballer who made more than 200 appearances in the Football League playing as a full back for Brighton & Hove Albion, Grimsby Town and Peterborough United.

References

1947 births
Living people
Footballers from Brighton
English footballers
Association football fullbacks
Brighton & Hove Albion F.C. players
Grimsby Town F.C. players
Peterborough United F.C. players
Cambridge City F.C. players
Wisbech Town F.C. players
English Football League players